Elise Broach (born September 20, 1963) is an American writer. Her publications include the acclaimed novels Shakespeare's Secret, Desert Crossing, and Masterpiece. She holds undergraduate and graduate degrees in history from Yale University and lives in Easton, Connecticut.

Book awards 

Broach's book When Dinosaurs Came with Everything was a 2008 ALA Notable Children's Book, earned an Illinois Monarch Award nomination and an E.B. White Read Aloud Award, and was listed as the number one Children's Book of 2007 by Time.

Shakespeare's Secret was 2006 Edgar Award Juvenile Mystery finalist.

Masterpiece, illustrated by Kelly Murphy, was a 2008 Publishers Weekly Best Book of the Year in Children's Fiction, a 2009 ALA Notable Children's Book, and is the winner of the 2009 E.B. White Read Aloud Award and a New York Times best seller.

Bibliography

Novels
 Shakespeare's Secret, Henry Holt and Co., 2005
 Desert Crossing, Henry Holt and Co., 2006
 The Wolf Keepers, illustrated by Alice Ratterree, Henry Holt and Co., 2016

Superstition Mountain trilogy
 Missing on Superstition Mountain, Henry Holt and Co., 2011
 Treasure on Superstition Mountain, Henry Holt and Co., 2013
 Revenge of Superstition Mountain, Henry Holt and Co., 2014

The Masterpiece Adventures 

 Masterpiece, illustrated by Kelly Murphy, Henry Holt and Co., 2008
 The Miniature World of Marvin & James, Henry Holt and Co., 2014
 James to the Rescue, Henry Holt and Co., 2015
 Trouble at School for Marvin & James, Henry Holt and Co., 2017
 Marvin and James Save the Day and Elaine Helps!, 2019
 A Trip to the Country for Marvin & James, 2020

Picture books
 What the No-Good Baby is Good For, illustrated by Abby Carter, G.P. Putnam's Sons, 2005
 Hiding Hoover, illustrated by Laura Juliska-Beith, Dial Books for Young Readers, 2005
 Wet Dog, illustrated by David Catrow, Dial Books for Young Readers, 2005
 Cousin John is Coming!, illustrated by Nate Lilly, Dial Books for Young Readers, 2006
 When Dinosaurs Came With Everything, illustrated by David Small, Atheneum Books for Young Readers, 2007
 Gumption!, illustrated by Richard Egielski, Atheneum Books for Young Readers, 2010
 Seashore Baby, illustrated by Cori Doerrfeld, Little, Brown, 2010
 Snowflake Baby, illustrated by Cori Doerrfeld, Little, Brown, 2011
 My Pet Wants a Pet, illustrated by Eric Barclay, Henry Holt and Co, 2018
 Bedtime for Little Bulldozer, illustrated by Barry E. Jackson, Henry Holt and Co, 2019

References

External links

 
 

1963 births
Living people
American children's writers
Yale College alumni
Novelists from Connecticut
21st-century American novelists
21st-century American women writers
American women children's writers
American women novelists
People from Easton, Connecticut
Yale Graduate School of Arts and Sciences alumni